De Diesbach Castle is a castle in the municipality of Torny of the Canton of Fribourg in Switzerland.  It is a Swiss heritage site of national significance. Between 1692 and 1732 it was built for the de Diesbach family who owned it until 1798. Today it is owned by Archduke Rudolf of Austria (son of Archduke Carl Ludwig).

See also
 List of castles in Switzerland
 Château

References

Cultural property of national significance in the canton of Fribourg
Castles in the canton of Fribourg